Burning Hammer may refer to:
the inverted Death Valley driver when performed by Kenta Kobashi, for which he won an award in 1998
an album by Sex Machineguns in 2001
the Argentine DDT performed by Tyler Reks from 2009 to 2012